Heide Boikat is a retired slalom canoeist who competed for West Germany in the mid-1960s. She won a bronze medal in the K-1 team event at the 1965 ICF Canoe Slalom World Championships in Spittal.

References

West German female canoeists
Possibly living people
Year of birth missing (living people)
Medalists at the ICF Canoe Slalom World Championships